Polba is a village in Polba Dadpur CD Block in Chinsurah subdivision of Hooghly district in the state of West Bengal, India.

Geography

Location
The area is composed of flat alluvial plains that form a part of the Gangetic Delta.

Police station
Polba police station has jurisdiction over a part of Polba Dadpur CD Block.

Urbanisation
In Chandannagore subdivision 58.52% of the population is rural and the urban population is 41.48%. Chandannagore subdivision has 1 municipal corporation, 3 municipalities and 7 census towns. The single municipal corporation is Chandernagore Municipal Corporation. The municipalities are Tarakeswar Municipality, Bhadreswar Municipality and Champdany Municipality. Of the three CD Blocks in Chandannagore subdivision, Tarakeswar CD Block is wholly rural, Haripal CD Block is predominantly rural with just 1 census town, and Singur CD Block is slightly less rural with 6 census towns. Polba Dadpur and Dhaniakhali CD Blocks of Chinsurah subdivision (included in the map alongside) are wholly rural. The municipal areas are industrialised. All places marked in the map are linked in the larger full screen map.

Demographics
As per the 2011 Census of India, Polba had a total population of 6,626 of which 3,333 (50%) were males and 3,293 (50%) were females. Population below 6 years was 628. The total number of literates in Polba was 4,643 (77.41% of the population over 6 years).

Transport
Polba is on Pandua-Bandel Road. Mogra-Polba Road and Polba-Alinagar Road also meet at Polba.

Education
Polba Mahavidyalaya, a general degree college, was established at Polba in 2005. It is affiliated with the University of Burdwan and offers honours courses in Bengali, English, Sanskrit, history and philosophy.

Healthcare
There is a rural hospital (with 30 beds) at Polba.

References

Villages in Hooghly district